Phantom, Rocker & Slick was an American rock band active in the mid-1980s. The bandmembers were drummer Slim Jim Phantom, bassist Lee Rocker, and guitarist Earl Slick. Phantom and Rocker had previously played together as members of the Stray Cats. They released two albums, Phantom, Rocker & Slick and Cover Girl, on EMI Records before disbanding.

History
 Slim Jim Phantom and Lee Rocker grew up together in New York City. They began writing songs when they were 12 years old. Along with Brian Setzer, they formed the Stray Cats. When the Stray Cats broke up, they began looking for a new guitarist and met sessionman Earl Slick at a music trade show, leading to the formation of the band. Years earlier, Rocker had been a fan of Slick's guitar work on David Bowie's David Live. Slick also played on Bowie's Station to Station and John Lennon's Double Fantasy.
Their first release, 1985's self-titled Phantom, Rocker & Slick, was produced by Michael Barbiero & Steve Thompson and was a moderate success, peaking at 62 on the Billboard 200. Its first single was "Men Without Shame" and was written in ten minutes. It did well on the Top Rock Tracks chart, peaking at number 7. It was played in the active rotation on MTV. The single "My Mistake" also appeared on the Top Rock Tracks chart, peaking at 33, and featured Keith Richards of The Rolling Stones on guitar.  Nicky Hopkins also made a guest appearance on the album, playing piano on the track "No Regrets".

The release of their second album, Cover Girl in 1986, was the beginning of the end for the band. It did poorly, reaching only 181 on the Billboard 200 and they soon broke up, with Phantom and Rocker rejoining the Stray Cats and Slick returning to session work.

Members
Slim Jim Phantom – drums, vocals
Lee Rocker – double bass, lead vocals
Earl Slick – guitar, vocals

Discography
Phantom, Rocker & Slick 1985 (EMI)
Cover Girl 1986 (EMI)

Charts

Albums

Singles

References 

Musical groups established in 1983
Musical groups disestablished in 1986
American hard rock musical groups
Rockabilly music groups